Horno de Alcedo is a village in the municipality of Valencia, located in the Pobles del Sud district. Its population was 1,204 in 2017.

References

Geography of Valencia
Towns in Spain